John Jeffrey (14 November 1826 – 1854) was a Scottish botanist and plant-hunter active in the United States.

Life

Jeffrey was born in Forneth, Parish of Clunie, west of Blairgowrie and Rattray in east Perthshire. While working as a gardener for Edinburgh's Royal Botanic Garden, he was appointed by a Scottish group known as the Oregon Association (established 1849) to travel to North America. There he would collect seeds and continue the efforts of botanist David Douglas (1799–1834).

Jeffrey arrived at Hudson Bay in August 1850 and travelled more than  overland to reach the Columbia River. He then spent the next four years exploring Washington, Oregon, and California, sending his specimens back to Scotland. In 1854 he disappeared while travelling from San Diego across the Colorado Desert. Despite attempts to find him, he was never seen again.

At the time, Jeffrey was criticised for poor results but his discoveries, particularly of conifers, were significant. The Jeffrey Pine (Pinus jeffreyi), which he discovered near California's Mount Shasta in 1852, and the flowering plant Dodecatheon jeffreyi were named in his honour.

External links
"John Jeffrey in the Wild West:Speculations on his Life and Times" - Frank A. Lang

References 
 Coville, Frederick V., "The Itinerary of John Jeffrey, An Early Botanical Explorer of Western North America", in Proceedings of the Biological Society of Washington, 23 March 1897. Vol. 11, pp. 57–60.
 Harvey, A. G., "John Jeffrey: Botanical Explorer", in The Siskiyou Pioneer in Folklore, Fact and Fiction and Yearbook, Siskiyou County Historical Society. 1947. pp. 17–19, 39.
 Woods, P. and J., "The Oregon Expedition 1850–1854: John Jeffrey and his Conifers", Acta Horticulturae 615: IV International Conifer Conference.

Specific

Scottish botanists
1826 births
1854 deaths
Plant collectors
People from Perth and Kinross